Alin Liţu (born 22 October 1986 in Craiova, Romania) is a retired football striker that was under contract with Steaua București.

Career

Debut
Coming out through the youth ranks of Steaua București, Alin Liţu made his debut under the coaching of Walter Zenga on 8 May 2005, during the Oţelul – Steaua 1-0 match. Used intermittently during the last part of that season, Liţu never really proved his point and ended up playing for the Steaua II during the following season.

Jiul spell
During the 2006–2007 season he was loaned to CS Jiul Petroşani, where he played a total of 10 matches, but didn't score a single goal.

Gloria Buzău spell
For the 2007–2008 season, Steaua București loaned him to newly promoted Gloria Buzău, where he would make a name for himself and earn first team experience. The season was disappointing for him, in terms of goalscoring – only four goals in 37 appearances. His loan was extended for another 6 months (the first half of the 2008–2009 season) before returning to Steaua București.

Steaua return
After an impressive winter training period, where he scored many goals and seemed to be one of the frontrunners for occupying a first team spot, Liţu spent most of the following period playing for the Steaua II or coming as a sub in few matches.

In 2009–10, Liţu was demoted to the B squad.

In January 2010 Steaua II București loaned Liţu to Gaz Metan Mediaş until June 2012.

Honours
Steaua București
Romanian Championship League: 2004–05

External links
 

1986 births
Living people
Sportspeople from Craiova
Romanian footballers
FC Steaua București players
FC Steaua II București players
CSM Jiul Petroșani players
FC Gloria Buzău players
CS Gaz Metan Mediaș players
Expatriate footballers in Cyprus
ASIL Lysi players
Association football forwards